Erik Glümer (20 September 1915 – 29 September 1960) was a Danish footballer. He played in three matches for the Denmark national football team from 1938 to 1940.

References

External links
 

1915 births
1960 deaths
Danish men's footballers
Denmark international footballers
Place of birth missing
Association footballers not categorized by position